Brigadier-General Ralph Abercrombie Berners  (14 June 1871 – 25 February 1949) was a 
British Army officer who briefly commanded the 4th Division during the First World War.

Military career
Educated at Eton College and the Royal Military College, Sandhurst, Berners was commissioned into the Royal Welch Fusiliers on 28 October 1890. He was posted to India and took part in the Hazara Expedition in 1888 and then joined the International Squadron in Crete in 1897.

After a tour in command of the regimental depot in the early 20th century, Berners was given command of the 1st Battalion of his regiment in France in May 1915 during the First World War. He commanded his battalion at the Battle of Loos in September 1915 and then transferred to the 9th battalion of his regiment which was also engaged on the Western Front. He was appointed a Companion of the Distinguished Service Order on 4 June 1917.

After Major-General William Lambton was incapacitated on 12 September 1917, Berners briefly took over command of the 4th Division and remained in command until he was relieved on 21 September 1917. He went on to command a brigade in the 2nd Indian Division in summer 1919 during the Third Anglo-Afghan War before retiring in 1920.

References

1871 births
1949 deaths
Companions of the Distinguished Service Order
Royal Welch Fusiliers officers
British Army brigadiers

Graduates of the Royal Military College, Sandhurst
People educated at Eton College